The Aztec mastiff bat (Molossus aztecus) is a species of bat in the family Molossidae. It is insectivorous.

Taxonomy and etymology
It was  described as a new species in 1860 by Swiss scientist Henri Saussure. Its species name "aztecus" refers to the indigenous Aztecs of Mexico, where this species was first documented.

Description
It is one of the smallest bats of the genus Molossus.
Its fur is chocolate brown and its patagia, nose, and ears are very dark brown. Individuals weigh .

Biology and ecology
It is nocturnal, foraging for its insect prey at night and roosting in hollow trees during the day. Unusually for its genus, females may become pregnant while still nursing a pup.

Range and habitat

It is found from Jalisco and Cozumel Island in southern Mexico to Nicaragua and has been reported from Guatemala but not from El Salvador or Honduras. It has also been reported from southern Venezuela. It is endemic to Mexico.

References

Molossus (bat)
Mammals described in 1860
Bats of Central America
Taxa named by Henri Louis Frédéric de Saussure